"Down and Out" is a song by American rapper Cam'ron, released as the fifth and final single from his fourth studio album Purple Haze (2004). It features guest appearances from singer Syleena Johnson and rapper Kanye West. Though West received the sole producer credit for the track, he acknowledged that the beat was primarily produced by Brian "All Day" Miller.

Charts

Radio and release history

References 

2004 songs
2005 singles
Cam'ron songs
Kanye West songs
Songs written by Kanye West
Song recordings produced by Kanye West
Roc-A-Fella Records singles
Songs written by Cam'ron
Syleena Johnson songs